Venga Juan is a Spanish comedy television series created by Diego San José for HBO Max which stars Javier Cámara. It consists of a continuation of Vota Juan and Vamos Juan. It premiered on 28 November 2021.

Premise 
After his spell as minister and his return to local politics, Juan Carrasco (now with transplanted hair) has established himself as a board member of a big company. But his past comes to haunt him in the form of legal prosecution due to a corruption case he got involved with back when he was serving as Mayor of Logroño.

Cast

Production 
Guillermo Farré, José Skaf and Miguel Salvat were credited as executive producers on behalf of WarnerMedia whereas Diego San José, Alejandro Flórez and Javier Méndez were credited as executive producers on behalf of 100 Balas (The Mediapro Studio). The writing team was formed by Diego San José (showrunner) together with Víctor García León, Daniel Castro, Pablo Remón, Diego Soto and Pilar Palomero, whereas the direction of the episodes was carried out by Víctor García León, Tom Fernández, Pilar Palomero and Javier Cámara. Shooting began in June 2021. In September 2021, the series was showcased together with other HBO Max originals (Todo lo otro, Sin novedad and ¡García!) at the 69th San Sebastián International Film Festival. It consists of 7 episodes.

References 

2020s Spanish comedy television series
HBO Max original programming
Spanish-language television shows
Spanish political satire
Political comedy television series
Political satirical television series